Laminins are a family of glycoproteins of the extracellular matrix of all animals. They are major components of the basal lamina (one of the layers of the basement membrane), the protein network foundation for most cells and organs. The laminins are an important and biologically active part of the basal lamina, influencing cell differentiation, migration, and adhesion.

Laminins are heterotrimeric proteins with a high molecular mass (~400 to ~900 kDa). They contain three different chains (α, β and γ) encoded by five, four, and three paralogous genes in humans, respectively. The laminin molecules are named according to their chain composition. Thus, laminin-511 contains α5, β1, and γ1 chains. Fourteen other chain combinations have been identified in vivo. The trimeric proteins intersect to form a cross-like structure that can bind to other cell membrane and extracellular matrix molecules. The three shorter arms are particularly good at binding to other laminin molecules, which allows them to form sheets. The long arm is capable of binding to cells, which helps anchor organized tissue cells to the basement membrane.

The laminin family of glycoproteins is an integral part of the structural scaffolding in almost every tissue of an organism. They are secreted and incorporated into cell-associated extracellular matrices. Laminin is vital for the maintenance and survival of tissues. Defective laminins can cause muscles to form improperly, leading to a form of muscular dystrophy, lethal skin blistering disease (junctional epidermolysis bullosa) and defects of the kidney filter (nephrotic syndrome).

Types
In humans, fifteen laminin trimers have been identified. The laminins are combinations of different alpha-, beta-, and gamma-chains.

Five alpha-chain isoforms: LAMA1, LAMA2, LAMA3 (which has three splice forms), LAMA4, LAMA5
Four beta-chain isoforms: LAMB1, LAMB2, LAMB3, LAMB4 (note that no known laminin trimer incorporates LAMB4 and its function remains poorly understood)
Three gamma-chain isoforms: LAMC1, LAMC2, LAMC3

Laminins were previously numbered as they were discovered, i.e. laminin-1, laminin-2, laminin-3, etc., but the nomenclature was changed to describe which chains are present in each isoform (laminin-111, laminin-211, etc.). In addition, many laminins had common names before either laminin nomenclature was in place.

Function 
Laminins form independent networks and are associated with type IV collagen networks via entactin, fibronectin, and perlecan. They also bind to cell membranes through integrins and other plasma membrane molecules, such as the dystroglycan glycoprotein complex and Lutheran blood group glycoprotein. Through these interactions, laminins critically contribute to cell attachment and differentiation, cell shape and movement, maintenance of tissue phenotype, and promotion of tissue survival. Some of these biological functions of laminin have been associated with specific amino-acid sequences or fragments of laminin. For example, the peptide sequence [GTFALRGDNGDNGQ], which is located on the alpha-chain of laminin, promotes the adhesion of endothelial cells.

Laminin alpha4 is distributed in a variety of tissues including peripheral nerves, dorsal root ganglion, skeletal muscle and capillaries; in the neuromuscular junction, it is required for synaptic specialisation. The structure of the laminin-G domain has been predicted to resemble that of pentraxin.

Role in neural development
Laminin-111 is a major substrate along which nerve axons will grow, both in vivo and in vitro. For example, it lays down a path that developing retinal ganglion cells follow on their way from the retina to the tectum. It is also often used as a substrate in cell culture experiments. The presence of laminin-1 can influence how the growth cone responds to other cues. For example, growth cones are repelled by netrin when grown on laminin-111 but are attracted to netrin when grown on fibronectin. This effect of laminin-111 probably occurs through a lowering of intracellular cyclic AMP.

Role in peripheral nerve repair
Laminins are enriched at the lesion site after peripheral nerve injury and are secreted by Schwann cells. Neurons of the peripheral nervous system express integrin receptors that attach to laminins and promote neuroregeneration after injury.

Pathology
Dysfunctional structure of one particular laminin, laminin-211, is the cause of one form of congenital muscular dystrophy.  Laminin-211 is composed of an α2, β1 and γ1 chains.  This laminin's distribution includes the brain and muscle fibers.  In muscle, it binds to alpha-dystroglycan and integrin alpha7—beta1 via the G domain, and via the other end, it binds to the extracellular matrix.

Abnormal laminin-332, which is essential for epithelial cell adhesion to the basement membrane, leads to a condition called junctional epidermolysis bullosa, characterized by generalized blisters, exuberant granulation tissue of skin and mucosa, and pitted teeth.

Malfunctional laminin-521 in the kidney filter causes leakage of protein into the urine and nephrotic syndrome.

Role in cancer

Some of the laminin isoforms have been implicated in cancer pathophysiology. The majority of transcripts that harbor an internal ribosome entry site (IRES) are involved in cancer development via corresponding proteins. A crucial event in tumor progression referred to as epithelial to mesenchymal transition (EMT) allows carcinoma cells to acquire invasive properties. The translational activation of the extracellular matrix component laminin B1 (LAMB1) during EMT has been recently reported suggesting an IRES-mediated mechanism. In this study, the IRES activity of LamB1 was determined by independent bicistronic reporter assays. Strong evidences exclude an impact of cryptic promoter or splice sites on IRES-driven translation of LamB1. Furthermore, no other LamB1 mRNA species arising from alternative transcription start sites or polyadenylation signals were detected that account for its translational control. Mapping of the LamB1 5'-untranslated region (UTR) revealed the minimal LamB1 IRES motif between -293 and -1 upstream of the start codon. Notably, RNA affinity purification showed that the La protein interacts with the LamB1 IRES. This interaction and its regulation during EMT were confirmed by ribonucleoprotein immunoprecipitation. In addition, La was able to positively modulate LamB1 IRES translation. In summary, these data indicate that the LamB1 IRES is activated by binding to La which leads to translational upregulation during hepatocellular EMT.

Use in cell culture
Together with other major components of the ECM, such as collagens and fibronectin, laminins have been used to enhance mammalian cell culture, especially in the case of pluripotent stem cells, as well as some primary cell cultures, which can be difficult to propagate on other substrates. Two types of naturally-sourced laminins are commercially available. Laminin-111 extracted from mouse sarcomas is one popular laminin type, as well as laminin mixtures from human placenta, which may primarily correspond to laminin-211, 411 or 511, depending on the provider. The various laminin isoforms are practically impossible to isolate from tissues in pure form due to extensive cross-linking and the need for harsh extraction conditions, such as proteolytic enzymes or low pH, that cause degradation. Therefore, recombinant laminins have been produced since the year 2000. This made it possible to test if laminins could have a significant role in vitro as they have in the human body. In 2008, two groups independently showed that mouse embryonic stem cells can be grown for months on top of recombinant laminin-511. Later, Rodin et al. showed that recombinant laminin-511 can be used to create a totally xeno-free and defined cell culture environment to culture human pluripotent ES cells and human iPS cells.

Laminin domains

Laminins contain several conserved protein domains.

Laminin I and Laminin II
Laminins are trimeric molecules; laminin-1 is an alpha1 beta1 gamma1 trimer. It has been suggested that the domains I and II from laminin A, B1 and B2 may come together to form a triple helical coiled-coil structure.

Laminin B
The laminin B domain (also known as domain IV) is an extracellular module of unknown function. It is found in a number of different proteins that include, heparan sulphate proteoglycan from basement membrane, a laminin-like protein from Caenorhabditis elegans and laminin. Laminin IV domain is not found in short laminin chains (alpha4 or beta3).

Laminin EGF-like
Beside different types of globular domains each laminin subunit contains, in its first half, consecutive repeats of about 60 amino acids in length that include eight conserved cysteines. The tertiary structure of this domain is remotely similar in its N-terminus to that of the EGF-like module. It is also known as a 'LE' or 'laminin-type EGF-like' domain. The number of copies of the laminin EGF-like domain in the different forms of laminins is highly variable; from 3 up to 22 copies have been found. In mouse laminin gamma-1 chain, the seventh LE domain has been shown to be the only one that binds with a high affinity to nidogen. The binding-sites are located on the surface within the loops C1-C3 and C5-C6. Long consecutive arrays of laminin EGF-like domains in laminins form rod-like elements of limited flexibility, which determine the spacing in the formation of laminin networks of basement membranes.

Laminin G
The laminin globular (G) domain, also known as the LNS (Laminin-alpha, Neurexin and Sex hormone-binding globulin) domain, is on average 177 amino acids in length and can be found in one to six copies in various laminin family members as well as in a large number of other extracellular proteins. For example, all laminin alpha-chains have five laminin G domains, all collagen family proteins have one laminin G domain, the CNTNAP proteins have four laminin G domains, while neurexin 1 and 2 each hold six laminin G domains. On average, approximately one quarter of the proteins that hold laminin G domains is taken up by these laminin G domains themselves. The smallest laminin G domain can be found in one of the collagen proteins (COL24A1; 77 AA) and the largest domain in TSPEAR (219 AA).

The exact function of the Laminin G domains has remained elusive, and a variety of binding functions has been ascribed to different Laminin G modules. For example, the laminin alpha1 and alpha2 chains each have five C-terminal laminin G domains, where only domains LG4 and LG5 contain binding sites for heparin, sulphatides and the cell surface receptor dystroglycan. Laminin G-containing proteins appear to have a wide variety of roles in cell adhesion, signalling, migration, assembly and differentiation.

Laminin N-terminal
Basement membrane assembly is a cooperative process in which laminins polymerise through their N-terminal domain (LN or domain VI) and anchor to the cell surface through their G domains. Netrins may also associate with this network through heterotypic LN domain interactions. This leads to cell signalling through integrins and dystroglycan (and possibly other receptors) recruited to the adherent laminin. This LN domain-dependent self-assembly is considered to be crucial for the integrity of basement membranes, as highlighted by genetic forms of muscular dystrophy containing the deletion of the LN module from the alpha 2 laminin chain. The laminin N-terminal domain is found in all laminin and netrin subunits except laminin alpha 3A, alpha 4 and gamma 2.

Human proteins containing laminin domains

Laminin domain I: all laminin alpha chains (LAMA1, LAMA2, LAMA3, LAMA4, LAMA5)
Laminin domain II: all laminin alpha chains (LAMA1, LAMA2, LAMA3, LAMA4, LAMA5)
Laminin B (domain IV): all laminin alpha chains (LAMA1, LAMA2, LAMA3, LAMA4, LAMA5), gamma chains (LAMC1, LAMC2, LAMC3), and perlecan (HSPG2)
Laminin EGF-like (domains III and V): all laminin chains (LAMA1, LAMA2, LAMA3, LAMA4, LAMA5, LAMB1, LAMB2, LAMB3, LAMB4, LAMC1, LAMC2, LAMC3), attractins (ATRN, ATRNL1), cadherin EGF LAG seven-pass G-type receptors (CELSR1, CELSR2, CELSR3), cysteine-rich with EGF-like domain proteins (CRELD1, CRELD2), multiple EGF-like domain proteins (MEGF6, MEGF8, MEGF9, MEGF10, PEAR1), most netrins (NTN1, NTN3, NTN4, NTNG1, NTNG2), mucins 3A and 3B (MUC3A, MUC3B), class F scavenger receptors (SCARF1, SCARF2), stabilins (STAB1, STAB2), agrin (AGRIN), angiopoietin-1 receptor (TEK), perlecan (HSPG2), tenascin N (TNN), and usherin (USH2A).
Laminin G domain: all laminin alpha chains (LAMA1, LAMA2, LAMA3, LAMA4, LAMA5), cadherin EGF LAG seven-pass G-type receptors (CELSR1, CELSR2, CELSR3), contactin-associated proteins (CNTNAP1, CNTNAP2, CNTNAP3, CNTNAP3B, CNTNAP4, CNTNAP5), some collagens (COL5A1, COL5A3, COL9A1, COL11A1, COL11A2, COL12A1, COL14A1, COL15A1, COL16A1, COL18A1, COL19A1, COL20A1, COL21A1, COL22A1, COL24A1, COL27A1), crumbs homologs 1 and 2 (CRB1, CRB2), fat homologs (FAT1, FAT2, FAT3, FAT4), NEL-like proteins (NELL1, NELL2), neurexins (NRXN1, NRXN2, NRXN3), slit homologs (SLIT1, SLIT2, SLIT3), thrombospondins (THBS1, THBS2, THBS3, THBS4, TSPEAR), agrin (AGRIN), chondroitin sulfate proteoglycan 4 (CSPG4), eyes shut homolog (EYS), growth arrest-specific protein 6 (GAS6), perlecan (HSPG2),  pikachurin (EGFLAM), protein S (PROS1), sex hormone-binding globulin (SHBG) and usherin (USH2A)
Laminin N-terminal (domain VI): most laminin chains (LAMA1, LAMA2, LAMA3, LAMA5, LAMB1, LAMB2, LAMB3, LAMB4, LAMC1, LAMC3), most netrins (NTN1, NTN3, NTN4, NTNG1, NTNG2), and usherin (USH2A)

See also 
 Substrate adhesion molecules
 Laminin database
 List of target antigens in pemphigoid

References

External links 

The Laminin Protein

 (lecture by Professor Erhard Hoheneseter)